Academy of Applied Pharmaceutical Sciences (AAPS) Inc. is an English-language private post-secondary career college specializing in pharmaceutical, food and healthcare training. The college has one main campus located in the North York district of Toronto, Ontario.

History 

AAPS was founded in 2003 by Dr. Barghian and Laleh Bighash, whose combined vision was to integrate a simulated work environment into an academic setting. The overall purpose of this type of learning scheme was to enhance students' abilities to launch their post-degree professional careers in the pharmaceutical industry. 
Student enrollment at AAPS averages at 100-120 students per academic year. The student graduation rate is 98%, and the post-graduation employment rate is 85%, both of which are among the highest rates compared other pharmaceutical industry training schools.

Timeline
 2003: Dr. Barghian and Laleh Bighash found and establish the Academy of Applied Pharmaceutical Sciences (AAPS) Inc.
 2004: AAPS becomes the first private career college to offer a diploma program in Professional Regulatory Affairs.
 2005: AAPS launched the Continuing Education unit, providing workshop, courses, and certificate training for pharmaceutical industry careers.
 2007: AAPS becomes the first private career college to offer a diploma program in Clinical Research
 2009: AAPS becomes first career college in Canada to offer diploma programs in Food Safety and Quality
 2010: AAPS launches online courses and online certificate programs
 2014: AAPS becomes the first private career college in Canada to offer a ministry approved diploma program in professional Clinical Research and Pharmacovigilance

Programs 

The courses and programs offered at AAPS range across various disciplines within Life Science and Pharmaceutical training, including:

 Professional Diploma in Clinical Research and Pharmacovigilance
 Canadian Registered Nurse Examination (CRNE) Preparation
 Certificate Programs that include over 150 courses in the areas of Pharmaceutical Sales, Project Management, Validation, Six Sigma, High Performance Liquid Chromatography (HPLC), and Pharmaceutical Laboratory.
 Diploma Programs:
 Food Safety and Quality
 Pharmaceutical Quality Assurance and Quality Control
 Pharmaceutical Quality Control
 Regulatory Affairs
 Clinical Research and Pharmacovigilance
 Workshops and Free Live Webinar Programs on various pharmacy and business-related topics

Facilities 

AAPS has three on-site facilities in order to expose students to laboratory environments and protocol. Students work independently and are given the opportunity to work directly with materials and equipment, as well as to run various experiments and tests. Each of the three facilities is dedicated to a particular domain:

 Pharmaceutical Laboratory: fully equipped for students to perform tests on pharmaceutical raw material, in-process material and finished products.
 Analytical Chemistry Laboratory: includes sample preparation station, wet chemistry testing station, physical chemistry testing station, HPLC, UV, IR, Autotitrators, pH meters.
 Microbiology Laboratory: dedicated to microbiological, pathogenic and food allergen testing.

See also 
 Canadian Pharmacists Journal
 Higher education in Ontario

External links 
 Academy of Applied Pharmaceutical Sciences (AAPS) Inc. website

Private colleges in Ontario